Carlo Amado Hernandez (born November 11, 1960) is an American former professional baseball coach. He has coached in Major League Baseball (MLB) for the California Angels, Tampa Bay Devil Rays, Detroit Tigers, Cleveland Indians, Miami Marlins, Atlanta Braves, and New York Mets.

Career
Prior to his coaching career, he played in the New York Yankees minor league system from 1979 to 1983. He also played part of the 1983 season in the Chicago White Sox system. A broken arm that year ended his playing career.

Hernandez has served as pitching coach for the California Angels (1993–96), Tampa Bay Devil Rays (2004–05), and Detroit Tigers (2006–08). In , he served as the bullpen coach for the Cleveland Indians, but was fired along with Manager Eric Wedge and the rest of the staff at the season's end. After the 2010 season, the University of South Florida hired Hernandez as their pitching coach.

Hernandez was then pitching coach for the GCL Phillies and then the Miami Marlins.  In November 2015 he was hired as Minor League pitching coordinator for the Atlanta Braves. On October 11, 2016, Hernandez was named the pitching coach for the Atlanta Braves.  On October 15, 2018, Hernandez was dismissed from his duties as the pitching coach for the Braves.

On December 9, 2018, the New York Mets hired Hernandez as their bullpen coach.  His time in New York was short-lived, however; on June 20, 2019, he, along with pitching coach Dave Eiland, were fired as part of a staff shakeup.

References

External links

 Official Detroit Tigers bio

 
 
 
 
 
 
 

Living people
1960 births
Appleton Foxes players
Atlanta Braves coaches
Baseball players from Tampa, Florida
California Angels coaches
Cleveland Indians coaches
Detroit Tigers coaches
Fort Lauderdale Yankees players
Greensboro Hornets players
Major League Baseball bullpen coaches
Major League Baseball pitching coaches
Miami Marlins coaches
New York Mets coaches
Nashville Sounds players
Oneonta Yankees players
Tampa Bay Devil Rays coaches